Sergio Escudero (エスクデロ 競飛王, Esukudero Seruhio; ; born 1 September 1988) is a professional footballer who plays as an attacking midfielder or striker who is currently playing for a Salvadorian club Atlético Marte.

Born in Spain, he has represented the Japan U23 national team internationally. He is the son of Argentine-Japanese footballer Sergio Ariel Escudero.

Career
When Escudero was three years old, he moved to Japan because of his father's work and joined the local club team. After living in Japan for five years, he moved to Argentina and Escudero began his career with the Vélez Sársfield youth team, where his father, also named Sergio Ariel Escudero and uncle Osvaldo Salvador Escudero have played. Then he was called up to the U-15 Argentina national team training camp.

In 2001, Escudero returned to Japan and joined Kashiwa Reysol junior youth team in Chiba and later moved to Urawa Red Diamonds junior youth team in Saitama. He scored many goals in youth level league matches and contracted with Urawa Reds in 2005. Playing as a forward, Escudero made his debut as a professional on 15 April 2005, against Albirex Niigata at the age of 16 years, 8 months and 21 days and he became the second youngest J. League Division 1 player after Takayuki Morimoto. In 2006, German outfit VfB Stuttgart were interested in him but Urawa refused to release him.

On 11 June 2007, he obtained his Japanese citizenship and therefore he had a chance to play for the Japan U-20 team at 2007 FIFA U-20 World Cup in Canada. However he failed to make it to the tournament since the squad was submitted before he became a Japanese citizen. In May 2008, he joined the U-23 national team which played at the 2008 Toulon Tournament and scored a goal against Ivory Coast.

On 17 July 2012, Escudero joined South Korean outfit FC Seoul on a six-month loan deal. He received number 26 and scored his debut goal on 21 July. He scored four goals and provided three assists in the end of the season. His loan was made permanent in December. He scored the opening goal and assisted Dejan Damjanovic's 2–2 equalizer in the 2013 AFC Champions League Final match against China powerhouse Guangzhou Evergrande in 26 October 2013. His impressive performance made him Man of the Match.

On 25 February 2015, Escudero signed a two-year contract with Chinese Super League side Jiangsu Guoxin-Sainty.

On 1 August 2022, Escudero joined a Primera División club C.D. Atlético Marte.

Personal life
The son of former Argentine-Japanese footballer of the same name, he was born to Argentine parents of Spanish descent in Spain, and thus held dual Argentine and Spanish citizenship. In 2007, he acquired Japanese citizenship automatically as a result of his father's naturalization. Escudero is a cousin of Damián Escudero and nephew of Osvaldo Escudero.

Career statistics

Club

International 

Scores and results list Japan U23's goal tally first, score column indicates score after each Escudero goal.

Honours
Urawa Red Diamonds
 J. League Division 1: 2006
 Emperor's Cup: 2005, 2006
 AFC Champions League: 2007
 Japanese Super Cup: 2006

FC Seoul
 K League Classic: 2012

Jiangsu Guoxin-Sainty
 Chinese FA Cup: 2015

References

External links
 Profile at Kyoto Sanga
 
 
 Q&A with Escudero at fussballD21
 Yahoo! Sports Profile  
 

1988 births
Living people
Footballers from Granada
Citizens of Argentina through descent
Argentine footballers
Spanish footballers
Japanese footballers
Japanese expatriate footballers
J1 League players
J2 League players
K League 1 players
Primera División de Fútbol Profesional players
Salvadoran Primera División players
Chinese Super League players
Urawa Red Diamonds players
FC Seoul players
Jiangsu F.C. players
Kyoto Sanga FC players
Ulsan Hyundai FC players
Tochigi SC players
Expatriate footballers in South Korea
Japanese expatriate sportspeople in South Korea
Expatriate footballers in China
Japanese expatriate sportspeople in China
Expatriate footballers in El Salvador
Argentine sportspeople of Spanish descent
Spanish people of Argentine descent
Sportspeople of Argentine descent
Naturalized citizens of Japan
Japanese people of Spanish descent
Japanese people of Argentine descent
Sergio Escudero
Association football forwards